An office is a room or other area in which people work, or a position within an organization with specific duties and rights attached.

Office may also refer to:

Computer software
Office suite, Bundled business productivity software  
Ability Office
Collabora Online
ConceptDraw Office
Corel WordPerfect Office
Feng Office
LibreOffice
Microsoft Office
Mini Office II
Polaris Office
Siag Office
SoftMaker Office
Wang OFFICE
WPS Office
Zoho Office
 The Office (video game), a 2007 game based on the 2005 U.S. television series

Film
Office (2015 Hong Kong film), a musical comedy-drama film
Office (2015 South Korean film), a thriller horror film
The Office (film), a 1966 Polish short film

Politics
Political office, the authority to govern served by an elected official
Public office, the authority to execute government policy

Music
Office (band), a Chicago-based rock band

Religion
Daily Office, also called Canonical hours, the recitation of such prayers in Christianity more generally
Holy Office, also called the Congregation for the Doctrine of the Faith in Roman Catholicism
Liturgy of the Hours, the recitation of certain Christian prayers at fixed hours according to the discipline of the Roman Catholic Church
 Private offices, such as prayers in the morning and evening, as described in Luther's Small Catechism
Other offices in Christian Liturgy, such as Matins and Vespers

Television 
Office (TV series), a 2013 Indian Tamil-language comedy series
The Office (1995 TV series), an American comedy series starring Valerie Harper
The Office, an international television franchise
The Office (British TV series), 2001–2003
The Office (American TV series), 2005–2013
Le Bureau, a French TV series, 2006
HaMisrad, an Israeli TV series, 2010–2013
La Job, a French Canadian TV series, 2006–2007

Other uses
Office, Kendrick, American football player
Office Holdings, which operates the "Office" chain of shoe shops in the UK and Ireland
La Oficina (lit. The Office), a Chilean intelligence agency that existed in the 1990s

See also

Officer (disambiguation)
Official (disambiguation)
Minister (Christianity), ordained offices in Christianity

it:Ufficio